Albert Prince (November 17, 1825 – July 18, 1875) was an Ontario lawyer and political figure. He represented Essex in the Legislative Assembly of Ontario as a Liberal member from 1871 to 1874.

He was born in Cheltenham, Gloucestershire, England in 1825, the son of John Prince, and came to Sandwich (later Windsor) in Upper Canada with his family in 1833. He practised law at Sandwich. He died in Essex County in 1875 of apoplexy.

External links 

1825 births
1875 deaths
Ontario Liberal Party MPPs
People from Cheltenham